The Lahore Qalandars cricket team is one of six teams that competed in the 2019 Pakistan Super League, representing Lahore. 

Originally the Qalandars were to be captained by Mohammad Hafeez, but due to an injury, he was unable to participate. AB De Villiers captained two matches while Fakhar Zaman led the side in six matches. They finished sixth in the season after winning three of their ten matches, and as a result, were eliminated in the group stage for the fourth consecutive year. Lahore Qalandars Brand Ambassador Shaheen Shah Afridi is a renowned bowler.

Squad
Players with international caps are shown in bold
Ages are given as fo the first match of the season, 14 February 2019

Season standings

Points table

References

External links

2019 in Punjab, Pakistan
2019 Pakistan Super League 
Qalandars in 2019
2019